The Bettani, also spelled Baittani or Bhittani, is a Pashtun tribe located mostly in Afghanistan and Pakistan. The Bettani are named after Shaykh Beṭ, their legendary ancestor who is said to be the second son of Qais Abdur Rashid. The Bettani's are Sunni Muslims of Hanafi sect. The Bettani confederacy includes the tribes of Bettanis, and Matti tribes progeny of BiBi Mattu daughter of Sheikh Bettan. These include Lodi also known as Lohani, as well as the tribes of Marwat, and Niazi while Shirani has also been mentioned as part of Bettanis.

History
According to Makhzan-e-Afghani the Bettani are said to be named after their ancestor Betṭ Baba (claimed by a legend to be the first Pashto poet), who lived in the Altamur range which is located between Logar and Zurmat and he was buried in Ghazni according to the legend.

Bhittani's of Quetta Balochistan:- according to Captain J.A  Robinson "Notes on Nomad Tribes of Eastern Afghanistan" published in 1934, out of 100 families of Powinda/Nomad Bhittani's, there were three villages of Bhittani's in Karabagh and Ghazni and about out of 100 families, 30 families merged with "Mian Khel" and 70 families scattered among the "Nasar" tribes. The means of livelihood of these Bhittani's were the same as that of the tribes with which they live. Some of these families of katagran clan of nomad Bhittani's migrated towards Quetta in 1880s and started their abode with Kamal khails, Naimat Khels and Yahya Khel clans of nomad Nasar tribes.

The Betani are known to have lived in the Logar, Zurmat and Ghazni area until the 15th century, but then they came into conflict with the Ghilji and the Bettanis were expelled from the area towards the east. Some lineages succeeded to take control of Gabarḡar, which is located between the Bannu Basin and Dēra, while other Bettani lineages migrated further northeastwards.

Settlements

Bettani reside in Pakistan in Tank and Lakki Marwat, a territory that is a buffer zone separating Tank and Lakki Marwat districts from the Mahsud tribe of central Waziristan in Pakistan's Federally Administered Tribal Areas. Jandola is considered the capital of the Bettani tribes.

District Tank, DI Khan, Lakki Marwat & Punjab, District Shakar Garh

The area is mainly inhabited by the Bhittanis who have four sub-sections namely Tatta, Bakhtiyari, Waraspon, and Dhanna. They also inhabit D.I. Khan and Bannu, mostly the mountainous area on the borders of Tank and Bannu from the Gabbar mountain in the north to the Gomal valley in the south.

During the reign of Pashtun Sultans of Delhi, some of them enjoyed prestigious positions, and a large number of them used to serve in the Sultanate's army.

Bhittanis tribe is divided in four sections: Tattao- at Jandola, Siraghar, Dera Ismail Khan and some adjoining areas; Bakhtiyari- at some part of Pakistan, Petlad-Gujarat (India) and some adjoining areas; Dhanna- on the Gabbar mountain and in Lakki Marwat; Waraspun- inhabiting the Dera Ismail Khan and some adjoining valleys. District Lakki Marwat is inhabited by the Boba, Bobak and Wargara clans of the Bhittanis. Most of Danni- inhabiting in Tank and some adjoining valleys.

Organisation of the tribe
The Bettani tribe has four sub-tribes, which are called Tattha, Bakhtiyari, Wraspoon and Dhana. The Tattha is further subdivided into three clans: the Umarkhail, Aba Khel, Naimat Khel and Khaishi. The Dhana tribe is divided into Ali khail, Bobi, Waroki and Dadi Khel subclans. The Wraspoon subdivides into Mazyani, Tari, Chapli and Shakhi. The Betani have always been few in numbers: From 8–9,000 in about 1884 they are said to have increased to more than 43,000 by about 1960. The current numbers of Bettani tribe around 200,000 and 250,000 individuals.

Cultural notes
Hospitality is given importance and tea is the most popular consumable item. The tribe has demonstrated a keen interest in facilitating the educational accomplishments of youth; as a result, several doctors of this tribe contribute their services in different parts of the country and abroad. Bettanis are patriotic and loyal to their country. The tribal youth are fond of sports, including traditional sports Hinda, Kabadi, Kath Kath, football, volleyball and cricket. Cricket and football are popular sports among the youth. Bettani is fond of traditional dancing called (Attan, Tarai). During marriage parties, anyone can join the night dancing party without any formal invitation. Traditional drummers (Daman) were hired during marriage parties to entertain the participants. The dancing styles of this tribe are very different from other Pashtun tribes. People of all ages can be seen dancing at parties. Similarly, the female of this tribe are also fond of dancing particularly on the occasion of marriages but they do it within their houses, separately. The local female drummers were hired for entertaining the females. In most of the marriages, a big launch is offered to the relatives, villagers and participants of the marriage. While in the evening close friends and relatives are invited for dinner. During evening dinner drummers are playing the drums and the relatives and friends come along with sheep or goats, it is called in Pashtu 'Balanai'. On Balanai aerial firing was also given by the attendants on the entry into the marriage premises. Cousin marriages are common in this tribe. Tribal women are very fond of wearing ornaments and jewellery of all types made of gold and silver. A lot of money is spent on the local ceremonies, particularly on marriage, death, birth and other ceremonies/festivals like the celebration of Eid and performing Hajj. Most marriages arearranged, and most people live in a joint family system.

All Pakistan Bett Baba Football Tournament
Annual All Pakistan Bett Baba Football Tournament was organized at erstwhile Tank Jandola Sub division. The football teams from all over the country participating in the tournament. Recently the final match chief guest was IG FC South Major General Umar Bashir. The tournament was jointly organized by the FC South and Elders of the tribe and took place over 35 days.

Bettani Foods 
Commonly eaten foods include ghee, a bread called aishal, beef, and boiled rice with lassi, potato curry, butter kari, milk kari, boiled meat, Fried meat "Larmoon", beef pualao, chicken pualao, sweet rice (zarda), boiled grains, wheat halwa sweet), salt onion bread, sweet bread (kakoray), fried tomato, fried eggs, tomato sauce, all kind of vegetables curry, makan and pure ghee. Deserts include tikdhee (a sugar and flour mixed cookies) drinks include tea, lemonade and lasi (butter water).

Politics 
Bettani tribe culture is different from other Pashtuns.

In minor matters, disputes are common and sometimes ongoing for decades. On different occasions, they also cooperate, and their internal matters are decided in three Bettani jirga (tribal councils/(dary bettanay) based upon the three subclans of Tattha, Wraspoon and Dhana. The rival families give complete authority to the three Bettani councils, and the council's decisions are generally obeyed, but in cases of opposition to these decisions, a family may be fined. If the dispute is of bigger nature between the tribes then the DCO, MNA and Senators, elders, sometimes from neighbouring Districts also participate in the jirga to resolve the disputes. The people have to accept the decision made by the jirga. The jirga results are presented to the DCO for information and record. If any one of the parties is not happy or satisfied with the decision made by the jirga then the grieved party can go to the appellate court and then the Home Department. Traditionally the household head has a stronghold and decision-making power for the whole family. The wives are traditionally submissive to their husbands and the likelihood of divorce or separation in the tribal society is negligible. The Bhittani are the hereditary enemies of the Mahsuds, however, over the centuries they have joined them during important battles against invaders. In August 2007, Bhittani tribesmen threatened a Lashkar against Mahsud tribesmen if they did not return 16 kidnapped Bhittanis. Mahsud raiders had to pass through Bhittani territory to enter the nearby areas so the Mehsud tribe always avoid any kind of clash with the Bhittani tribe.

Occupations 
Agriculture is a widespread source of income as the land is very fertile. Crops include tomatoes, sugar cane, wheat, beans, melons and other fruits and vegetables. Livestock, such as sheep, goats and cattle, are a primary source of income. Most of the aged tribeswomen work in fields with the other family members. Especially tomato is the main crop cultivated in different areas including Ummar Adda, Maghzai, Tank Zam area and Tank. Many of the men of this tribe serve in the Frontier Constabulary and Frontier Corps. Many people of this tribe work as PTC and CT teachers in the education department in the respective districts. Nowadays scores of Bettani tribesmen are engaged in business, trade, commerce, Government and private sector and other respectable professions like the medical field. The tribesmen are serving the country with a spirit of devotion and dedication.

Education 
Nearly 60 per cent people of the tribe are educated. Earlier people dependent only on the agriculture and livestock but now most of the keen to provide education to their children. Several government Primary and few high schools and one Government College for Boys is imparting education to the students in District Tank. However, there is dire need to establish more primary and high schools particularly for female students. According to one survey, nearly 90 per cent youth of the tribe have basic education. But to poverty several people only have access to high, secondary schools and colleges. It is a good sign that the educated youth are broad minded and talented. The people will appreciate government and non government organizations to come forward and establish more educational institutions, technical and vocational centers in the areas. Annually eight students four from lakki and four from tank of the Tribe, availing admission opportunity on Quota in Medical colleges of the country. Most of students students is very fashionable, modern and open mind

Bettani Tourism 
Sur Ghar (Red Hill), is a hill destination near Peeng Area bordering the South Waziristan Agency. Some of the tribesmen are residing there permanently, while some families during summer shifting there for enjoying the pleasant weather. The weather of Sur Ghar remained pleasant during summer. Another place is "Khuviya", a forest in the hills, used for hunting Teeter birds and Rabbits. Another place is Tank Zam, (a proposed small dam) a stream where hills water dividing into three streams. Other famous hills included Sobati Katch, Jandola, Manzai, and Wali Lakki Hills.

Bhittani Sufi Saints 
The Shrine of Mama Peer is situated near Umar Adda (a town in the settled area), several people in the area visit shrine of Mama Peer on daily basis and particularly on Friday. A large number of devotees also visit the shrine of Sufi saint Sheikh Younas situated near Jandola.

Weather 
The climate in the region is hot in summer, with high temperatures around 110 °F, and cool in winter, with low temperatures around 40 °F. The average annual rainfall amount is 10 to 11 inches, with most rainfall in July and August. The driest months are October and November. Most of the streams which originate from the region are seasonal and normally end up in the arid plains of District Tank. The region experiences hot summers and cold winters. The summer season is from April to October with June, July and August as the hottest months. The winter season is from November to March, with December, January and February as the coldest months.

Religion 
The Bettani tribe are Muslim, Both Sunni and Shia Sect.

Notable people 
 
 
Qais Abdur Rashid
Zafar Beg Bhittani
Sheikh Mohammad Rohani
Mufti Abdul Shakoor

References

Further reading
 Muntazir Bettani Poetry book Kuthab stuarey
 Historical Pashtu book written by Sohail Bettani "De Bettanu Tarikh" (History of Bhittani Tribe)
 The Batani, Baitani or Bhittani 1935) "Powindah Bhittani" Notes on Nomad Tribes of Eastern Afghanistan Government of India Press, New Delhi, India, page 158.
 Daniel Balland
 Encyclopædia Iranica
 Sulaiman Maku Book Tazkerat Al Awliya (Memoirs of Saints) (612 Hijera, 1216 AD) edited and annotated by Abdul Hai Habibi

Pashtun tribes
Pashto-language surnames